Kenya Ordnance Factories Corporation (KOFC) is a state-owned defense corporation which is headquartered in Eldoret–Kitale Road 20 km from Eldoret, Kenya.

References

External links
 

Military industry
Ammunition manufacturers
Industry in Kenya
Companies of Kenya
Military of Kenya
Companies established in 1997